Christ's Resurrection Church may refer to:

 Christ's Resurrection Church, Brzeg, in Brzeg, Poland
 Christ's Resurrection Church, Kaunas, in Kaunas, Lithuania

See also
 Church of the Resurrection (disambiguation)